Rented World is the fourth studio album by American punk rock band The Menzingers.

Recording
The band entered Miner Street Recordings, the first time the band recorded in Philadelphia, Pennsylvania, in October 2013 with producer Jonathan Low (Venice Sunlight, Restorations).

Release
"In Remission" was released to radio on March 3, 2014. "I Don't Wanna Be an Asshole Anymore" was released to radio on March 31, 2014. Rented World was released through Epitaph Records on April 22, 2014. The band released a music video for "I Don't Wanna Be an Asshole Anymore" on the day the album was released. Between mid-February and early April 2015, the band went on tour with Taking Back Sunday.

Reception

The album was included at number 22 on Rock Sounds "Top 50 Albums of the Year" list. The album was included at number 25 on Kerrang!s "The Top 50 Rock Albums Of 2014" list.

Track listing
All songs written by The Menzingers

Personnel
The Menzingers
Tom May – guitar, vocals
Joe Godino – drums
Greg Barnett – guitar, vocals
Eric Keen – bass

Chart positions

References
Citations

Sources

 

2014 albums
The Menzingers albums
Epitaph Records albums